Roberto Carlos da Silva Rocha (born 10 April 1973), known as Roberto Carlos, is a Brazilian former professional footballer who now works as a football ambassador. He started his career in Brazil as a forward but spent most of his career as a left-back and has been described as the "most offensive-minded left-back in the history of the game". In 1997, he was runner-up in the FIFA World Player of the Year. Widely considered one of the greatest left backs in history, in 2004 he was named by Pelé in the FIFA 100 list of the world's greatest living players.

At club level, Roberto Carlos joined Real Madrid from Inter Milan in 1996 to spend 11 highly successful seasons, playing 584 matches in all competitions and scoring 71 goals. At Real, he won four La Liga titles and the UEFA Champions League three times. In April 2013, Marca named him in their "Best Foreign Eleven in Real Madrid's History". He is one of the few players to have made over 1,100 professional career appearances at club and international level.

Roberto Carlos made his debut for the Brazil national team in 1992. He played in three World Cups, helping the team reach the final in 1998 in France, and win the 2002 tournament in South Korea and Japan. He was named in the FIFA World Cup All-Star Team in 1998 and 2002. With Brazil he is especially known for a bending 40-yard free kick against France in the inaugural match of Tournoi de France 1997. With 125 caps he has made the third-most appearances for his national team. He was chosen on the FIFA World Cup Dream Team in a 2002 FIFA poll.

He took up management and was named as the manager of Sivasspor in the Turkish Süper Lig in June 2013. He resigned as head coach in December 2014. From January to June 2015, he was manager of Akhisarspor. Although Roberto Carlos announced his retirement from playing at the age of 39 in 2012, in July 2015 he was appointed player/manager of Indian Super League club Delhi Dynamos, with whom he would make three appearances.

Club Life

Early years

Roberto Carlos began his professional career playing for União São João, a football club based in Araras in the state of São Paulo. In 1992, despite playing at what was seen as a lesser club and only being 19 years old, he was called up for the Brazil national team. In August 1992, aged 19, he joined Atlético Mineiro on loan and went on the club's tour of Europe. The tour consisted of the B team, as the club was prioritising the first Copa CONMEBOL in South America at the same time. The tour served as a test for many players, and those who stood out could be integrated definitively to the main group. Roberto Carlos did not participate in the first two games in Italy but played the full match against Lleida in Spain on 27 August in a match for the Ciutat de Lleida Trophy. He remained in the team for the next two games, held in Logroño, against Logroñés and Athletic Bilbao. Before retiring from football in 2014, Roberto Carlos thanked Atlético Mineiro for the opportunity.

In 1993, Roberto Carlos joined Palmeiras, where he played for two seasons, winning two consecutive Brazilian league titles. After almost signing for Aston Villa side in 1995, Roberto Carlos chose a move to Inter Milan, in the Serie A, playing one season for the Nerazzurri. He scored a 30-yard free-kick on his debut in a 1–0 win over Vicenza but his season at Inter was unsuccessful, with the club finishing seventh in Serie A.

In an interview with FourFourTwo in a May 2005 issue, Roberto Carlos said that the then-coach of Inter, Roy Hodgson, wanted him to play as a winger, but Roberto Carlos wanted to play as a left back. Roberto Carlos spoke to Inter owner Massimo Moratti "to see if he could sort things out and it soon became clear that the only solution was to leave".

Real Madrid
Roberto Carlos joined Real Madrid in the year 1996 close season. When newly appointed manager Fabio Capello learned that Roberto Carlos had become transferable he barely could believe it, and he asked chairman Lorenzo Sanz to travel to Milan immediately. An agreement had been reached 24 hours later. Roberto Carlos was given the number 3 shirt and held the position as the team's first choice left-back from the 1996–97 season until the 2006–07 season. During his 11 seasons with Madrid, he appeared in 584 matches in all competitions, scoring 71 goals. He is Real Madrid's most capped foreign-born player in La Liga with 370 appearances, after breaking the previous record of 329 held by Alfredo Di Stéfano in January 2006. During his Real Madrid career, Roberto Carlos was, alongside Milan and Italy legend Paolo Maldini, considered the greatest left-back in the world. As a high-profile player and one of the most influential members of the team, Roberto Carlos was considered one of Madrid's Galácticos (which included Zinedine Zidane, Luís Figo, Ronaldo and David Beckham) during Florentino Pérez's first tenure as club president.

He won four La Liga titles with Madrid, and played in the 1998, 2000 and 2002 UEFA Champions League finals, assisting Zinedine Zidane's winning goal in 2002, considered one of the greatest goals in Champions League history. Roberto Carlos was named as Club Defender of the Year and included in the UEFA Team of the Year in 2002 and 2003. In the later part of his Real Madrid career, Roberto Carlos was named as one of the club's "three captains" alongside Raúl and Guti. Renowned for getting forward from his left-back position and scoring spectacular goals, in February 1998, he scored arguably his most memorable goal for Real Madrid with a bending volley struck with the outside of his left foot from near the sideline in a Copa del Rey match against Tenerife in what was described as an "impossible goal".

On the final day of the 2002–03 season, with Madrid needing to beat Athletic Bilbao to overtake Real Sociedad and win their 29th La Liga title, Roberto Carlos scored from a free-kick in the second minute of first half stoppage time to put los Blancos 2–1 ahead. The team eventually ran out 3–1 winners to wrap up the title. On 6 December 2003, Roberto Carlos scored the opening goal for Madrid as they beat Barcelona in El Clásico at Camp Nou for the first time in a La Liga match in 20 years.

In March 2007, in the second leg of the Champions League round of 16 against Bayern Munich, Roberto Carlos failed to control the backpass when Madrid kicked off, allowing Bayern's Hasan Salihamidžić to steal the ball and feed to Roy Makaay, who scored the quickest goal in Champions League history at 10.12 seconds. Roberto Carlos bore the brunt of criticism for that mistake which led to the team's elimination from the Champions League, and, on 9 March 2007, he announced he would leave Real Madrid upon the expiration of his contract at the end of the 2006–07 season. His final goal for Real Madrid was a stoppage time winner against Recreativo de Huelva with three games remaining in the 2006–07 La Liga season. The goal proved to be crucial to Real Madrid winning its 30th league title as they eventually finished level on points with Barcelona, becoming champions via the head-to-head rule. Madrid clinched La Liga in Roberto Carlos's final match, a 3–1 win over Mallorca at the Santiago Bernabéu Stadium.

Fenerbahçe
On 19 June 2007, Roberto Carlos signed a two-year contract (with one year optional) with the Turkish Süper Lig champions Fenerbahçe; he was presented at club's home ground, the Şükrü Saracoğlu Stadium, in front of thousands of fans. In the first official match he played with the team, Fenerbahçe won the Turkish Super Cup against Beşiktaş by a score of 2–1. During a league match against Sivasspor, he scored his first goal for Fenerbahçe on 25 August 2007 from a diving header, which was only the third headed goal of his career. He was injured during the final period of the same season and missed the title race between Fenerbahçe and rivals Galatasaray. His team eventually lost the title to their rivals, while guaranteeing a place for themselves in Champions League knockouts for the next season. He announced that he was unhappy about the final result and would do his best to carry the domestic trophy back to the Şükrü Saracoğlu Stadium.

On 7 October 2009, Roberto Carlos announced that he would leave Fenerbahçe when his contract expired in December 2009. He offered to return to Real Madrid and play for free, though he also said return to the Brazilian domestic leagues was a possibility, and announced his departure on 25 November. He made his last appearance for Fenerbahçe on 17 December, as a late substitute against Sheriff Tiraspol in the UEFA Europa League.

Corinthians

After 15 years away from Brazil, Roberto Carlos returned to his country in 2010 to play for Corinthians, joining his friend and former Real Madrid teammate Ronaldo.
On 4 June 2010, Roberto Carlos scored a goal against Internacional and helped Corinthians to move to the top of the Campeonato Brasileiro Série A table. The Timão won the game 2–0.
On 16 January 2011, Roberto Carlos scored an impressive goal directly from a corner kick against Portuguesa. Concerned with his safety after being threatened by fans after the Copa Libertadores da América defeat to Colombian club Tolima, Roberto Carlos requested his release by the club, which was promptly facilitated by Corinthians.

Anzhi Makhachkala

On 12 February 2011, after being heavily linked with a move to Notts County, Roberto Carlos signed a two-and-a-half-year contract with Russian Premier League club Anzhi Makhachkala, worth approximately €10 million. Playing in a defensive midfield position, Roberto Carlos was named captain of Anzhi on 8 March. On 25 April, he scored his first goal for Anzhi in a 2–2 draw with Dynamo Moscow, converting a 58th minute penalty. On 30 April, he scored his second goal, converting a penalty in a 1–0 win over Rostov, and on 10 June, he then scored his third goal on a 20th minute in a 2–0 win over Spartak Nalchik.

On 11 September 2011, Roberto Carlos scored his fourth goal in a 2–1 win over Volga Nizhny Novgorod. As of his first season for Anzhi, Roberto Carlos made 28 appearances and scored five goals. On 30 September, he became the caretaker coach of Anzhi following the sacking of Gadzhi Gadzhiyev, before Andrei Gordeyev assumed the role also in a caretaker capacity. Roberto Carlos announced his plans to retire at the end of 2012, but continued to work behind the scenes at Anzhi. In August 2012, Anzhi coach Guus Hiddink confirmed his retirement at a news conference in Moscow, also stating, "Roberto was a world class football player. Every master's career ends at some point."

Racism in Russia
In March 2011, during a game away at Zenit Saint Petersburg, a banana was held near Carlos by one of the fans as the footballer was taking part in a flag-raising ceremony. In June, in a match away at Krylia Sovetov Samara, Roberto Carlos received a pass from the goalkeeper and was about to pass it when a banana was thrown onto the pitch, landing nearby. Carlos picked it up and threw it by the sidelines, walking off the field before the final whistle and raising two fingers at the stands, indicating this was the second such incident since March.

Delhi Dynamos
He ended his professional playing career with a spell as player-manager of Delhi Dynamos of the Indian Super League.

International career

Roberto Carlos amassed 125 caps, scoring 11 goals for the Brazilian national team. He represented Brazil at three FIFA World Cups, four Copa América tournaments, the 1997 FIFA Confederations Cup and the 1996 Olympic Games.

He is especially famous for a bending 40-yard free kick against France in the inaugural match of Tournoi de France 1997 on 3 June 1997. The ball curled so much that the ball boy ten yards to the right ducked instinctively, thinking that the ball would hit him. Instead, it curled back on target, much to the surprise of goalkeeper Fabien Barthez, who just stood in place. This particular attempt has been considered to be the greatest free kick of all time. In 2010, a team of French scientists produced a paper explaining the trajectory of the ball.

At the 1998 World Cup, he played seven matches, including the final loss to France. After a qualifying game for the 2002 World Cup which was held in South Korea/Japan, Paraguay goalkeeper José Luis Chilavert spat on Roberto Carlos, an action which caused FIFA to give Chilavert a three-match suspension and forced him to watch the first game of the World Cup from the stands. Roberto Carlos played six matches in the finals, scoring a goal from a free kick against China, and was a starter in the final against Germany, with Brazil winning 2–0. After the tournament, he was also included in the World Cup All-Star Team. Roberto Carlos later referred to the 2002 World Cup winning team as a “band of brothers together”, and mentioned that the squad had a WhatsApp group and still talked regularly.

Roberto Carlos's next international tournament was the 2006 World Cup. In July 2006, after Brazil's 1–0 defeat to France in the quarter-finals, he announced his retirement from the national team, saying, "I've stopped with the national team. It was my last game." He said he no longer wanted to play for Brazil because of the criticism he faced from fans and Brazilian media for his failure to mark goalscorer Thierry Henry on France's winning goal.

Upon signing with Corinthians in January 2010, Roberto Carlos told TV Globo that he hoped to play at the 2010 World Cup and believed his return to Brazilian football may help him return to the national team, as manager Dunga had yet to settle on a left back. However, he was left off the 30-man provisional squad that was submitted to FIFA on 11 May 2010, along with Ronaldinho and Ronaldo. Despite his deep desire to do so, Roberto Carlos was ultimately not named in Dunga's final squad of 23 for the Brazilian squad for the World Cup. Instead, Brazil newcomer Michel Bastos earned a spot for the left back position.

Style of play

Tactically, Roberto Carlos started out playing football in Brazil as a forward – usually as a centre-forward or outside forward – but spent most of his career as defender, usually as a left-sided full-back or wing-back. In 2006, he was described as the "most offensive-minded left-back in the history of the game", by John Carlin of The New York Times; indeed, he was known for his forward surging runs throughout his career. Carlos is also widely considered by several pundits as one of the best left backs in the history of the sport. During his time at Inter, he was also used out of position as a winger in a 4–4–2 formation on occasion by manager Roy Hodgson, which had a negative impact on his performances, and often saw him caught out defensively; in his later career with Anzhi Makhachkala, he was instead deployed as a defensive midfielder in a three-man midfield, in order to compensate for his loss of pace and physical decline due to his advancing age.

A set-piece specialist, he is regarded as one of the foremost free kick takers of his generation, and was known for being capable of striking the ball powerfully – in particular from long range – and of producing curling shots with the outside of his left boot in dead ball situations. A talented and consistent player, with good dribbling skills at speed, as well as precise passing and crossing ability, he also possessed significant strength and excellent physical qualities, which along with his pace, work-rate, and energy, allowed him to cover the left flank effectively and assist at both ends of the pitch. While he earned a reputation as a hard-tackler, he was also known for being a clean player throughout his career. In addition to his stamina, running speed, technical skills, and crossing ability, he was also known for his long throw ins, as well as his strong  thighs, despite his small stature, which allowed him to accelerate quickly and strike the ball powerfully.

Media

Roberto Carlos has appeared in commercials for the sportswear company Nike. In 1998, he starred in a Nike commercial set in an airport in the buildup to the 1998 World Cup alongside a number of stars from the Brazil national team, including Ronaldo and Romário. In a Nike advertising campaign in the run-up to the 2002 World Cup in Korea and Japan, Roberto Carlos starred in a "Secret Tournament" commercial (branded "Scopion KO") directed by Terry Gilliam, appearing alongside other star footballers, including Ronaldo, Thierry Henry, Francesco Totti, Ronaldinho, Luís Figo and the Japanese Hidetoshi Nakata, with former player Eric Cantona the tournament's "referee".

Roberto Carlos has also starred in Pepsi commercials, including a 2002 World Cup Pepsi advertisement where he lined up alongside David Beckham, Raúl and Gianluigi Buffon in taking on a team of Sumo players.

Roberto Carlos features in EA Sports' FIFA video game series, and was selected to appear on the cover of FIFA Football 2003 alongside Manchester United winger Ryan Giggs and Juventus midfielder Edgar Davids. He was named in the Ultimate Team Legends in FIFA 15. In 2015, the arcade game company Konami announced that Roberto Carlos would feature in their football video game Pro Evolution Soccer 2016 as one of the new myClub Legends.

In 2016, Roberto Carlos launched a software called Ginga Scout that connects players with coaches across the globe. In April 2018, Carlos was announced as ambassador of Morocco's candidature of the 2026 FIFA World Cup.

Charity 
On 16 June 2019, Roberto Carlos took part in Soccer Aid at Stamford Bridge, London. He played for the World XI team which was captained by Usain Bolt and they beat the England XI on penalties.

In 2019, Roberto Carlos became the global ambassador of the international children's social programme Football for Friendship. Carlos attended programme's Forum and awarded the winners.

In January 2022, Bull In The Barne United, an English Sunday League pub team, won a raffle meaning that Roberto Carlos would play for them in a one-off friendly. The Shrewsbury-based side play in Division One of the Shrewsbury & District Sunday League and paid just £5 to enter the eBay raffle. On 4 March 2022, Roberto Carlos made a goalscoring debut for Bull In The Barne United during a 4–3 defeat to Harlescott Rangers in a friendly match at Hanwood.

Managerial career

Anzhi Makhachkala

Roberto Carlos had a brief spell as interim manager at Anzhi Makhachkala in early 2012. He later criticised the club upon resigning alongside manager Guus Hiddink.

Sivasspor
Roberto Carlos was appointed manager of Turkish Süper Lig team Sivasspor in June 2013. On 21 December 2014, he left the club following a defeat to İstanbul BB.

Akhisarspor
On 2 January 2015, Carlos was appointed as manager of Akhisarspor.

Delhi Dynamos
After finishing his season in Turkey, Roberto Carlos signed for Al-Arabi of the Qatari Stars League, but due to talks breaking down, he did not join the Qatari club. Then, on 5 July 2015, it was announced that he had signed to be the head coach of the Delhi Dynamos of the Indian Super League for the 2015 season.

At the end of the season, it was announced that he would not return to Delhi Dynamos in 2016.

In addition, he has also played in some of the Dynamos' matches.

Doping accusations
In 2017, a report of investigative journalists of German broadcasting station ARD revealed doping practices in Brazil, including physician Júlio César Alves who claims to have treated Carlos for many years. Carlos denies the allegations.

Personal life
Roberto Carlos was born in Garça, São Paulo, on 10 April 1973 to Oscar and Vera Lucia da Silva.

On 24 June 2005, Roberto Carlos was robbed by two gunmen while doing a live radio interview. He was not hurt but they took his watch and the interviewer's cellular phone.

On 2 August 2005, he was naturalised as a Spanish citizen. This proved important for Real Madrid, as it meant that he now counted as a European Union player, opening up one of the club's allowed three slots for non-EU players and enabling Real Madrid to sign fellow Brazilian Robinho.

For his 38th birthday, it was reported that Anzhi Makhachkala owner Suleyman Kerimov bought him a Bugatti Veyron.

Roberto Carlos has 11 children with 7 women. In October 2017, he became a grandfather when his daughter Giovanna gave birth to a son.

Career statistics

Club

International 

Scores and results list Brazil's goal tally first, score column indicates score after each Carlos goal.

Managerial statistics

Honours
Palmeiras
 Campeonato Brasileiro Série A: 1993, 1994
 Campeonato Paulista: 1993, 1994
 Torneio Rio–São Paulo: 1993

Real Madrid
 La Liga: 1996–97, 2000–01, 2002–03, 2006–07
 Supercopa de España: 1997, 2001, 2003
 UEFA Champions League: 1997–98, 1999–2000, 2001–02
 UEFA Super Cup: 2002
 Intercontinental Cup: 1998, 2002

Fenerbahçe
 Turkish Super Cup: 2007
Brazil
 FIFA World Cup: 2002; runner-up: 1998
 Copa América: 1997, 1999; runner-up: 1995
 FIFA Confederations Cup: 1997
 CONMEBOL Men Pre-Olympic Tournament: 1996
 Umbro Cup: 1995
 Lunar New Year Cup: 2005
 1996 Summer Olympics: Bronze Medalist
Individual
 Bola de Prata: 1993, 1994, 2010
 FIFA World Player of the Year: 1997 (silver)
 ESM Team of the Year (7): 1996–97, 1997–98, 1999–00, 2000–01, 2001–02, 2002–03, 2003–04
 FIFA World Cup All-Star Team: 1998, 2002
 Trofeo EFE: 1997–98
 UEFA Club Defender of the Year: 2002, 2003
 UEFA Team of the Year: 2002, 2003
 Ballon d'Or: 2002 (runner-up)
 Golden Foot: 2008
 Sports Illustrated Team of the Decade: 2009
 ESPN World Team of the Decade: 2009
 Campeonato Brasileiro Série A Team of the Year: 2010
 FIFA 100
 Brazilian Football Museum Hall of Fame
 Ballon d'Or Dream Team (silver): 2020
 11Leyendas Jornal AS: 2021
 IFFHS All-time Men's B Dream Team: 2021
 IFFHS South America Men's Team of All Time: 2021

See also 
 List of footballers with 100 or more UEFA Champions League appearances
 List of men's footballers with 100 or more international caps
 List of men's footballers with the most official appearances
 List of athletes who came out of retirement

References

External links

 Fansite website 
 
 Profile on Anzhi Makhachkala's official website

1973 births
Living people
People from Garça
Brazilian footballers
Brazilian expatriate footballers
Brazil under-20 international footballers
Brazil international footballers
Naturalised citizens of Spain
Association football fullbacks
União São João Esporte Clube players
Sociedade Esportiva Palmeiras players
Inter Milan players
Expatriate footballers in Italy
Real Madrid CF players
Expatriate footballers in Spain
Fenerbahçe S.K. footballers
Expatriate footballers in Turkey
Brazilian expatriate sportspeople in Turkey
Brazilian expatriate sportspeople in Spain
Sport Club Corinthians Paulista players
FC Anzhi Makhachkala players
Expatriate footballers in Russia
Campeonato Brasileiro Série A players
La Liga players
Süper Lig players
Serie A players
Russian Premier League players
FIFA 100
1993 Copa América players
1995 Copa América players
1997 Copa América players
1997 FIFA Confederations Cup players
1998 FIFA World Cup players
1999 Copa América players
2002 FIFA World Cup players
2006 FIFA World Cup players
Copa América-winning players
FIFA Confederations Cup-winning players
FIFA World Cup-winning players
Olympic footballers of Brazil
Footballers at the 1996 Summer Olympics
Olympic bronze medalists for Brazil
FIFA Century Club
Player-coaches
Olympic medalists in football
Sivasspor managers
Brazilian football managers
Brazilian expatriate football managers
Expatriate football managers in Turkey
Süper Lig managers
Akhisarspor managers
Indian Super League head coaches
Indian Super League marquee players
UEFA Champions League winning players
Indian Super League players
Medalists at the 1996 Summer Olympics
Brazilian expatriate sportspeople in Russia
Brazilian expatriate sportspeople in India
Expatriate football managers in India
Expatriate footballers in India
Brazilian expatriate sportspeople in Italy
Footballers from São Paulo (state)